Ângela Moraes Guadagnin (born Ângela Moraes on April 8, 1948, in Rio de Janeiro) is a Brazilian politician and physician. She was the mayor of São José dos Campos from 1993 to 1996, a federal deputy for the State of São Paulo from 1999 to 2006 (two four-year terms), and is currently a city councilwoman in São José dos Campos.

She caught national attention in 2006, when she performed the so-called "pizza dance" in the Chamber of Deputies of Brazil, in response to her fellow deputy João Magno having his charges of corruption dropped.

Early career
Guadagnin entered the course of medicine at the Universidade de Taubaté in 1968, graduating in 1974. In 1988, she mastered in public health in the University of São Paulo. In 2001, already a deputy, she obtained her master's degree in policies in the Federal University of Rio de Janeiro.

Pizza dance
Ângela Guadagnin is a member of Workers' Party (PT). She caught the attention of the Brazilian press when she performed a dance inside the Chamber of Deputies, celebrating that her fellow deputy João Magno of PT was absolved of charges of corruption in the Mensalão Affair. Magno's case was decided in a voting process among peers. Before the counting of the votes was finished (when it was already certain that Magno would be acquitted), Guadagnin stood up and, already dancing, walked towards the stairway and continued performing her dance in full view of TV cameras.

The dance was named "pizza dance" because of the Brazilian expression "acabar em pizza" (lit. to end up in pizza, which means to end up in nothing, to end up with no significant consequences, with people going out to eat pizza instead of biting the bullet). This expression has been frequently used to describe the absence of results in the investigation of politicians suspected of corruption.

She apologized, some time later, saying: "I can only ask for forgiveness and understanding, because I am a human being and I express my feelings."

The statewide repercussion of the episode was so great that Ângela Guadagnin was resoundingly defeated in the 2006 elections for the national Chamber of Deputies. Two years later she was successful in winning a seat in the City Council of São José dos Campos for 2009–2012.

References

External links
 Official website
 Ângela's profile at the Chamber's official website
  

Mayors of places in Brazil
People from Rio de Janeiro (city)
Federal University of Rio de Janeiro alumni
University of São Paulo alumni
Brazilian people of Italian descent
Brazilian women in politics
1948 births
Living people
Members of the Chamber of Deputies (Brazil) from São Paulo
Workers' Party (Brazil) politicians
São José dos Campos